Luise Doris Albertine Ribbe Schulze-Berghof (14 June 1889 - 1970) was a German composer, pianist, and teacher who performed for Berlin television. She published and performed as Luise Schulze-Berghof.

Schulze-Berghof was born in Potsdam. She studied piano and composition at the Berlin Academy and with Johannes Schulze and Gustav Kulenkampff. Later, she taught piano and performed on Berlin television.

Schulze-Berghof was a member of the American Society of Composers, Authors, and Publishers (ASCAP). She set some of her own texts to music. Her other compositions included:

Selected works

Piano 
pieces

Vocal 
lieder and ballads on texts by Carl Hermann Busse, Richard Dehmel, Knodt, Detlev von Liliencron, Salus, and Else Lasker-Schueler

Theatre 
Frau Einsamkeit

References 

1889 births
1970 deaths
German women composers
German pianists
ASCAP